The 2020–21 season was Alashkert's ninth season in the Armenian Premier League and fourteenth overall. Alashkert finished the season as Champions for the first time since 2017–18. Alashkert where also Runners Up in the Armenian Cup and where knocked out of the UEFA Europa League by Renova at the first qualifying round.

Season events
On 27 July, Alashkert announced that Henri Avagyan, Aleksandar Miljković, Nikita Baranov and Hayk Ishkhanyan had left the club after their contracts had been terminated by mutual consent, whilst Ognjen Čančarević, Tiago Cametá and Thiago Galvão had all extended their contract with the club. On the same day, Alashkert announced the signing of Grigor Aghekyan to a two-year contract from Gandzasar Kapan.

On 29 July, Alashkert announced the signing of Perdigão.

On 2 August, Edgar Manucharyan announced his retirement from football, and Alashkert announced the signing of Ihor Honchar.

On 7 August, Alashkert announced the signing of Aghvan Papikyan from Chojniczanka Chojnice.

On 12 August, Alashkert announced the signing of Rumyan Hovsepyan after his contract with Arda Kardzhali had expired.

On 4 September, after less than a month with the club, Aghvan Papikyan left the club to join Ararat Yerevan.

On 23 September, goalkeeper Andrija Dragojević Alashkert, having previously signed for the club in 2018, from Pyunik where his contract had expired.

On 29 September, the season was suspended indefinitely due to the escalating 2020 Nagorno-Karabakh conflict. On 13 October, the FFA announced that the season would resume on 17 October.

On 17 October, Alashkert announced the signing of Marko Tomić.

On 22 October, Alashkert's match against Ararat Yerevan was postponed due to 4 positive COVID-19 cases within the Alashkert team. A week later, their game against Ararat-Armenia was also postponed due to the positive COVID-19 cases.

On 5 January, Alashkert terminated their contract with head coach Yegishe Melikyan by mutual consent, with Abraham Khashmanyan being appointed as his replacement on 7 January.

On 14 January, Alashkert announced the signing of David Yurchenko.

On 2 February, Alashkert announced that Risto Mitrevski had returned to the club having previously left the club in October.

On 9 February, Alashkert announced the signing of Didier Kadio, with Mihailo Jovanović signing from Valletta the following day. On 11 February, Alashkert announced the signing of Dejan Boljević from Taraz.

On 12 February, Branko Mihajlović signed for Alashkert from Mačva Šabac.

On 21 February, Alashkert announced the signings of Gevorg Kasparov, Ashot Kocharyan, Vaspurak Minasyan, Davit Minasyan and Mihran Manasyan.

On 9 March, Alashkert announced the signing of Vincent Bezecourt who'd last played for Miami.

On 9 April, Alashkert's match against Shirak was postponed as Alashkert were unable to travel to Gyumri due to protests. The following day, the match was rearranged for 11 April.

On 20 May, Abraham Khashmanyan left his role as Head Coach by mutual consent, with Aleksandr Grigoryan being announced as his replacement the same day.

Squad

Transfers

In

Out

Released

Friendlies

Competitions

Premier League

Results summary

Results by round

Results

Table

Armenian Cup

Final

UEFA Europa League

Qualifying rounds

Statistics

Appearances and goals

|-
|colspan="16"|Players away on loan:
|-
|colspan="16"|Players who left Alashkert during the season:

|}

Goal scorers

Clean sheets

Disciplinary Record

References

FC Alashkert seasons
Alashkert
Alashkert